William Allen (22 October 1917 – 1981) was an English footballer.

Allen joined York City from Chesterfield in 1950. He then moved to Scunthorpe United in 1950, where he retired in 1952.

Notes

1917 births
People from Newburn
Footballers from Tyne and Wear
1981 deaths
English footballers
Association football forwards
Chesterfield F.C. players
York City F.C. players
Scunthorpe United F.C. players
English Football League players